Near field may refer to:

 Near-field (mathematics), an algebraic structure
 Near-field region, part of an electromagnetic field
 Near field (electromagnetism)
 Magnetoquasistatic field, the magnetic component of the electromagnetic near field
 Near-field communication (NFC) using the magnetic component of the electromagnetic near field (magnetoquasistatic field)

See also
 Near-field magnetic induction communication, a technique for deliberately limited-range communication between devices
 Near-field communication (NFC), a set of application protocols based on this
 Near-field optics
 Near-field scanning optical microscope